Al-Alam Sport Club is an Iraqi football team based in Saladin, that plays in Iraq Division One.

Managerial history
  Ali Jawad
  Adnan Mohammed
  Abdullah Al-Taiyawi 
  Natiq Haddad

See also 
 2019–20 Iraq FA Cup
 2021–22 Iraq FA Cup

References

External links
 Al-Alam SC on Goalzz.com
 Iraq Clubs- Foundation Dates

1997 establishments in Iraq
Association football clubs established in 1997
Football clubs in Saladin